Laberg or Laberget may refer to the following locations:

Laberg, Gratangen, a village in Gratangen municipality, Troms county, Norway
Laberg, Salangen, a village in Salangen municipality, Troms county, Norway
Laberget, Skånland, a village in Skånland municipality, Troms county, Norway